Ariamnes attenuatus is a species of comb-footed spider in the family Theridiidae. It is found from the Caribbean to Argentina.

References

Theridiidae
Spiders described in 1881
Spiders of the Caribbean
Spiders of South America